The Northeast Arm Deformation Zone, also known as the Northeast Arm Zone of Deformation, is a zone of deformation in Strathcona Township of Temagami, Ontario, Canada. It extends along the northeast arm of Lake Temagami. The Link Lake Deformation Zone just to the north is interpreted to be an extension of the Northeast Arm Deformation Zone.

See also
Net Lake-Vermilion Lake Deformation Zone
Tasse Lake Deformation Zone

References

Geologic faults of Temagami
Shear zones